Joseph M. M. Gray (1877 – January 10, 1957) was an American Methodist minister who was Chancellor of American University from 1933 until 1941.

References

Leaders of American University
1877 births
1957 deaths